Sulome Anderson is an American journalist. Her work has been published in Newsweek, Harper's, The Atlantic, and Foreign Policy.

In 2017, she published a book, The Hostage's Daughter: A Story of Family, Madness, and the Middle East which detailed her struggles with drug addiction and depression. The book won a bronze Nonfiction Book Award from the Nonfiction Authors Association.

Her father is journalist Terry A. Anderson, who was kidnapped and held hostage by Hezbollah from 1985 to 1991.

Legal issues
in December 2018 Sulome sued The Grayzone for defamation, only to have the lawsuit dismissed in June 2021, because the court decided that the lawsuit fell under anti-slapp statue. In 2021, Sulome appealed , only to be dismissed in april 2022 with prejudice .

References

External links

Sulome Anderson official website

21st-century American journalists
American women journalists
21st-century American memoirists
American women memoirists
Year of birth missing (living people)
Living people
21st-century American women